The Taiwan Power Company (Taipower) is a state-owned electric power industry providing electricity to Taiwan and off-shore islands of the Republic of China.

History
Taipower was established on 1 May 1946. Its origins can be traced to 1919 when Taiwan Power was founded during Japanese colonial rule.

In 1994 a measure which allowed independent power producers (IPP's) to provide up to 20 percent of Taiwan's electricity should have ended the monopoly. On 1 October 2012, Taipower allied with Taiwan Water Corporation to provide cross-agency integrated services called Water and Power Associated Service that accepts summary transactions between the two utilities. On 11 October 2012, the Economics Committee of the Legislative Yuan cut Taipower's budget for power purchases from IPP.

In July 2015, the Executive Yuan approved the amendments to the Electricity Act which were proposed by the Ministry of Economic Affairs, which will divide Taipower into two separate business groups in the next five to nine years: a power generation company and a power grid company. The measures were taken to improve efficiency within the company and to encourage positive competition within the industry.

On 20 October 2016, the Executive Yuan passed an amendments to the Electricity Act according to which Taipower will be divided into subsidiary companies in 6–9 years.

Operations 
Taipower operates all of Taiwan's two active nuclear power plants. It also operates coal power plants, but these are planned to be shut down in favor of natural gas turbines.

The company is expecting its first deliveries of liquefied natural gas (LNG) in 2023 as Taipower is moving away from coal for power generation.

Financials 
As of 2019, Taipower is the only Taiwanese state-owned company that is losing money, reporting a loss of NT$29.7 billion (US$955 million) during the first six months of 2019, a minus of NT$5.7 billion compared to the same period of 2018. The company attributed this on rising fuel prices and various anti-pollution measures which increased the costs of energy production.

Organizational structure
 Taiwan Power Research Institute
 Committees
 Department of Nuclear and Fossil Power Projects
 Legal Affairs Office
 New Business Development Office
 Department of Civil Service Ethics
 Department of Human Resources
 Department of Accounting
 Department of Industrial Safety
 Department of Public Relations
 Department of Environmental Protection
 Department of Information Management
 Department of Construction
 Department of Power Development
 Department of Finance
 Department of Materials
 Department of Fuels
 Department of System Operations
 Department of Corporate Planning
 Secretariat
 Distribution and Service Division
 Transmission System Division
 Nuclear Power Division
 Power Generation Division

Headquarters building
Taipower headquarters is housed in a 27-story building located in Zhongzheng District, Taipei. Completed in 1983, it was then the tallest building in Taiwan and the first building to surpass the 100 meter height.

See also

 Taiwan Power Company F.C.
 Taiwan Power Company Baseball Team
 List of power stations in Taiwan
 Electricity sector in Taiwan
 Energy in Taiwan
 Nuclear power in Taiwan
 Renewable energy in Taiwan
 List of companies of Taiwan

References

External links 

 
1946 establishments in Taiwan
Taiwanese companies established in 1946
Energy companies established in 1946